Svenska Cupen damer (the "Ladies Swedish Cup") is the main Swedish women's association football knock-out tournament.

A separate Svenska Cupen exists for men.

Rounds and teams
 First round – 44 teams (Division 1 and below)
 Second round – 36 teams (22 remaining teams from Round 1 + 14 teams from Elitettan)
 Third round – 32 teams (18 remaining teams from Round 2 + 14 teams from Damallsvenskan)
 Fourth round – 16 teams
 Fifth round – quarter finals
 Sixth round – semi finals
 Seventh round – final

How district teams qualify
There are a number of districts in the Swedish football organization, and each of them receives a number of spots in the Swedish Cup, due to how many licensed players they have. For an example, Värmlands FF receives three spots and Västergötlands FF receives seven spots.

Previous winners
Seasons 1998/1999 and 1999/2000 were played as fall/spring; all other seasons were played spring/fall.

The cup was also called Folksam Cup between 1981 and 1996.

The winners are:

Clubs by title

Footnotes

References

External links
Website at Swedish FA
Cup at women.soccerway.com

 (women)
Cup (women)
Sweden (women)
1981 establishments in Sweden
Recurring sporting events established in 1981
Football cup competitions in Sweden